The 2003 edition of the Women's Handball Tournament of the African Games was the 6th, organized by the African Handball Confederation and played under the auspices of the International Handball Federation, the handball sport governing body. The tournament was held in Abuja, Nigeria, contested by 8 national teams and won by Cameroon.

Draw

Preliminary round

Group A

Group B

Knockout stage
7th place match

5th place match

Championship bracket

Final ranking

Awards

References

External links
 Official website

Handball at the 2003 All-Africa Games
Women's handball in Nigeria
2003 in women's handball
Handball at the African Games